Anthony Cudahy (born Florida, 1989) is an American painter. Cudahy's approach is both figurative and abstract and takes inspiration from a breadth of source material ranging from personal photographs, movie stills, queer archival images and ephemera, and art history. Cudahy lives and works in Brooklyn, New York.

Early life and education 
Cudahy was born in Florida in 1989.

Cudahy graduated from the Pratt Institute, Brooklyn, New York in 2011 and will receive his MFA from Hunter College, New York, NY in 2020 (anticipated).

Work 
Cudahy's paintings are often a hybrid of visual histories blending various figures from art history and queer photography into contemporary scenes such as portraiture, domestic spaces, or social sites. Cudahy explains this in an interview, "The transformation and degradation an image is subjected to through reproduction creates a language itself with codes and signifiers. This can be the pixelation of an image repeating itself online or a cast shadow of a photographic flash placed in a painting. When I appropriate an image and translate it into painting, it is both an iteration and an interpretation. The painting is another chain in this lineage. Another layer in an image's history. The translation is my brain working through the image; the painting is a record of thoughts."

Exhibitions 
Solo exhibitions

 Night Paintings 1969 Gallery, New York, NY, 2018
 The Gathering, The Java Project, Brooklyn, NY, 2018
 NARSOLIPS, Cooler Gallery, Brooklyn, NY, 2016
 EatF_3, Mumbo's Outfit, within Geary Contemporary, New York, NY, 2016
 The Fourth Part of the Day, Farewell Books, Austin, TX, 2015
 Recent Work, Artha Project Space, Long Island City, NY, 2015
 Heaven Inside, Uprise Art Outpost, Chelsea, NY, 2014

Selected two-person and group exhibitions

 Moments of Intimacy, with Kyle Coniglio & Doron Langberg, 68 Projects, Berlin, Germany, 2018
 Metaxis Uber Pool, Hilde TX, Houston, TX, 2018
 CAPITA, Danese/Corey, NY, NY, 2018
 Rude Assembly, Sydney, Australia, 2018
 Queering Space, Alfred University, Alfred, NY, 2018
 Backyard Biennial, curated by Patrice Helmar, Ridgewood, Queens, 2017
 Visible Scene, Practice, NY, NY, 2017
 LOST IN THE WORLD, Mulherin, NY, NY, 2017
 CUDAHY/FRATINO/GLANTZ, Harpy Gallery, Rutherford, NJ, 2017
 Everything Real, Hap Gallery, Portland, OR, 2016
 WILL YOU, Pratt Institute's Dekalb Gallery, Brooklyn, NY, 2016
 Plus ça change, St. Josephs College, Brooklyn, NY, 2016
 Bindle, curated by Sorry Archive, Orgy Park, Brooklyn, NY, 2016
 Public/Private/Portrait, Mossless 4 release, Deli Gallery, L.I.C., NY, 2016
 CORPUS, Reverse, Brooklyn, NY, 2016
 Anthony Cudahy and Nick Van Zanten, the Dawn Hunter Gallery, Brooklyn, NY, 2015
 Decoding Campground Symbols, Cudayh, L.A., CA, 2015
 BLOOMSDAY, The Knockdown Center, Queens, NY, 2015
 Say It With Flowers, Kimberly-Klark Gallery, Ridgewood, NY, 2015
 A Faintly Lit Light, The Perfect Nothing Catalog, Brooklyn, NY, 2014
 And the Villagers Never Liked You Anyways, Sorry Archive at the Knockdown Center, Queens, NY, 2014
 Still Wearing Each Other When Alone, Vox Populi, Philadelphia, PA, 2014

References 

1989 births
Living people
21st-century American artists
Hunter College alumni
Pratt Institute alumni